Dhuʾayb ibn Mūsā al-Wādiʿī al-Hamdānī (died 29 April 1151 CE in Hooth, Yemen) was the first dāʿī al-muṭlaq, a position of spiritual authority in Tayyibi Isma'ili Islam. He was appointed to the position by Queen Arwa al-Sulayhi.

Career
Dhu'ayb began his career as a member of the pro-Fatimid, Musta'li daʿwa in Yemen, and rose to become an assistant of the local chief missionary (dāʿī), Yahya ibn Lamak. Shortly before his death in 1126, Ibn Lamak, after consulting the Sulayhid queen Arwa al-Sulayhi, chose him as his successor. 

In 1130, following the death of the Fatimid imam-caliph al-Amir bi-Ahkam Allah, Musta'li Isma'ilism was split into the Hafizi and Tayyibi branches, with the former acknowledging the succession of al-Amir's cousin al-Hafiz li-Din Allah, and the latter the succession of al-Amir's infant son, al-Tayyib. In Yemen, the hitherto pro-Fatimid queen Arwa sided with the Tayyibis and broke off relations with Cairo, while the regional dynasties of the Hamdanids and the Zurayids recognized al-Hafiz's claims. Until her death in 1138, Arwa effectively headed the new Tayyibi daʿwa, and came to be regarded by the Tayyibis as hujja, the living proof of the hidden (satr) imam al-Tayyib. With the support of Dhu'ayb and other dāʿīs, the queen spent most of her final years in organizing the new sect. Sometime after 1132, she appointed Dhu'ayb as dāʿī al-muṭlaq, thus making him the head of the daʿwa on behalf of the hidden imam. This was not an easy undertaking, as the other Yemeni rulers did not adopt Tayyibi Isma'ilism, and after Arwa's death, the Tayyibis were left without a strong patron. Nevertheless, precisely due to the establishment of an independent hierarchy, separate from both the Fatimids and the Sulayhids, the Tayyibi daʿwa managed to not only survive both regimes, but also spread in the region.

As dāʿī, Dhu'ayb managed to convert al-Khattab ibn al-Hasan ibn Abi'l-Hifaz, the chieftain of the al-Hajur clan of the Banu Hamdan tribe. A skilled warrior and notable poet and theologian, al-Khattab became Dhu'ayb's principal aide, and an important asset to the Sulayhid and Tayyibi cause, until his murder by his nephews in a dispute over control of al-Hajur in 1138. Al-Khattab was succeeded as chief assistant (maʾdhūn) by another Hamdanid, Ibrahim ibn al-Husayn al-Hamidi. When Dhu'ayb died in 1151, Ibrahim became the new dāʿī al-muṭlaq.

Mosque
During his reign, Syedna Zoeb built a masjid in Huth. The masjid lay in ruins for decades and was repaired and restored by Syedna Mohammed Burhanuddin in 1986.

Burial
Syedna Zoeb is buried in Huth, Yemen but his grave site is unknown.

References

Sources
 

1151 deaths
Year of birth unknown
12th-century Arabs
Tayyibi da'is
Yemeni Ismailis
Banu Hamdan
12th century in Yemen
12th-century Ismailis
12th-century Islamic religious leaders